Hot Pursuit is a 1987 American action comedy film directed by Steven Lisberger, written by Lisberger and Steven Carabatsos, and starring John Cusack, Robert Loggia, Wendy Gazelle, and Jerry Stiller.

Plot
High school student Dan Bartlett (John Cusack) misses the plane he was supposed to be on with his rich girlfriend and her family on the way to a Caribbean vacation during a school break. He flies there alone, and runs into a series of characters and misadventures as he tries to catch up. Ganja-smoking island natives give him a lift in their vehicle, but they don't quite make it as the family takes off on a chartered yacht. A crusty old sailor (Robert Loggia) with his own reasons takes up the chase with Bartlett on a decrepit sailboat. Bartlett then runs into corrupt cops and winds up in jail. Finally, he catches up to the yacht, only to find that the family has been taken hostage by pirates. He comes to the rescue.

Cast

Production
Pierre David developed the project with Steve Lisberger. David brought it to Tom Mankiewicz, who helped produce. RKO Pictures were willing to back the film but they only wanted to pay $2.8 million and filmmakers could not get the budget lower than $4 million. Mankiewicz managed to secure the additional funding from Ned Tanen at Paramount Pictures in exchange for cable rights.

Anthony Michael Hall was considered for the lead before the filmmakers decided to go with John Cusack.

Filming
The scenes at Dan's school ("Burnham preparatory school for boys") were filmed at St. Michaels University School in Victoria, British Columbia, Canada. A "Victoria Taxi" logo is visible on the cab that Dan takes to the airport.

Reception
According to Mankiewicz, "everyone came out fine" from the film "especially Cusack and Ben Stiller, who went on to bigger and better things". On Rotten Tomatoes the film has a score of 0% based on reviews from 5 critics.

References

External links
 
 

1987 films
1980s action comedy films
1980s adventure comedy films
American action comedy films
American adventure comedy films
American films about cannabis
Films directed by Steven Lisberger
Films scored by Tom Scott
Films set in the Caribbean
Films shot in British Columbia
Films shot in Mexico
RKO Pictures films
Pirate films
1987 comedy films
1980s English-language films
1980s American films